The Palu IV Bridge was an Indonesian suspension bridge that was located in city of Palu in the Indonesian province of Central Sulawesi. It spanned the Palu River, directly at its mouth in Palu Bay, and thus connected the districts of Besuru (East Palu) and Lere (West Palu).

The Palu IV Bridge was the first arch bridge on Sulawesi. It was inaugurated in May 2006 by President Susilo Bambang Yudhoyono and had two yellow arches, the middle pillar stood on a small river island.

On 28 September 2018, the bridge was hit and destroyed by the 2018 Sulawesi earthquake and tsunami.

The government announced that it would rebuild the bridge, taking earthquake safety factors into account. The Japanese development agency JICA is supporting the reconstruction with 2.5 billion yen.

References

Palu
Buildings and structures in Central Sulawesi
Bridges completed in 2006
Buildings and structures demolished in 2018
Arch bridges in Indonesia